Lansdale is a surname. Notable people with the surname include:

 Edward Lansdale (1908–1987), United States Air Force officer
 Joe Lansdale (footballer) (1894–1977), English footballer
 Joe R. Lansdale (born 1951), American writer and martial arts instructor
 John Lansdale Jr. (1912–2003), United States Army officer
 Kasey Lansdale, American musician
 Philip Lansdale (1858–1899), United States Navy officer
 Thomas Lancaster Lansdale (1748–1803), American army officer